Qaleh or Qal‘eh may refer to:

Ardabil Province
Qaleh, Ardabil, a village in Ardabil Province, Iran

Fars Province
Qaleh, Fars, a village in Jahrom County
Qaleh Kharabeh, Fars, a village in Sepidan County

Gilan Province
Qaleh, Gilan, a village in Gilan Province, Iran

East Azerbaijan Province
Qaleh, Azarshahr, a village in East Azerbaijan Province, Iran
Qaleh, Bostanabad, a village in East Azerbaijan Province, Iran
Qaleh, alternate name of Qaleh-ye Olya, a village in Bostanabad County, East Azerbaijan Province, Iran
Qaleh, Maragheh, a village in East Azerbaijan Province, Iran
Qaleh, Meyaneh, a village in East Azerbaijan Province, Iran

Hormozgan Province
Qaleh, Hormozgan, a village in Hormozgan Province, Iran

Kerman Province
Qaleh Rural District, in Kerman Province

Kermanshah Province
Qaleh, Kermanshah, a village in Kermanshah Province, Iran

Khuzestan Province
Qaleh, Ahvaz, a village in Khuzestan Province, Iran
Qaleh, Omidiyeh, a village in Khuzestan Province, Iran

Kurdistan Province
Qaleh, Kamyaran, a village in Kamyaran County
Qaleh, Kurdistan, a village in Qorveh County

Lorestan Province
Posht Qaleh, Lorestan, a village in Lorestan Province, Iran

Markazi Province
Qaleh, Khomeyn, a village in Khomeyn County
Qaleh, alternate name of Qaleh-ye Azraj, Markazi Province, Iran
Qaleh, alternate name of Gozal Darreh, Markazi Province, Iran

Mazandaran Province
Qaleh, Babol, a village in Mazadaran Province, Iran
Qaleh, Sari, a village in Mazadaran Province, Iran

North Khorasan Province
Pish Qaleh, a city in North Khorasan Province, Iran

Qazvin Province
Qaleh, Buin Zahra, a village in Qazvin Province, Iran
Qaleh, Qazvin, a village in Qazvin Province, Iran

Semnan Province
Dibaj, a city in Semnan Province, Iran
Qaleh Kharabeh, Semnan, a village in Semnan Province, Iran

West Azerbaijan Province
Qaleh Sardar, West Azerbaijan, a village in West Azerbaijan Province, Iran
Qaleh Bozorg, a village in West Azerbaijan Province

Zanjan Province
Qaleh, Abhar, a village in Zanjan Province, Iran
Qaleh, Khodabandeh, a village in Zanjan Province, Iran
Qaleh, Zanjan, a village in Zanjan Province, Iran

See also
Qaleh is a common element in Iranian place names; see